Emily Jayne Cummins (born 11 February 1987) is an English inventor and entrepreneur. She became interested in sustainability at an early age. At the age of four, she and her grandfather would create toys with materials and items found in his garden shed. This repurposing of scrap metal was the foundation of her later focus on sustainability, as she loves that idea that something new could be made from seemingly otherwise useless parts. Her knowledge of different materials and tools continued to expand and grow, later gaining a degree in Sustainability and Management at Leeds University.

Innovation & Invention
When it comes to designing, Emily focuses on a "back-to basics approach" when it comes to designing, as she believes this approach keeps an eye on the past as well as the future. This method combines the best of both worlds.

Invention #1 
During her time at the University of Leeds Emily learned about the world's reliance on fossil fuel energy, inspiring her to search for a solution that could help to cut down on global fossil fuel usage. The electricity that most refrigerators in homes run on is generated by the burning of fossil fuels. In response to this, Emily designed a fridge that stays cool without the use of electricity, instead being powered by "dirty water". After taking a gap year and traveling to an African Township in Namibia, Emily finalized her prototype. Her design consists of two metallic cylinders that fit inside one another. The empty space is then filled with locally sources materials such as sand, dirt. or wool. The materials are then soaked in water. As the fridge is placed in the sun and the outer cylinder begins to “sweat” the water from the inner materials begins to evaporate and transfer away from the inner cylinder, therefore becoming colder. It was during this time she realized that her fridge could have a tremendously positive impact on the people living in underdeveloped countries. Although her original pain point was to focus on fossil fuel emissions, Emily shifted and was able to solve a different pain point for those in underdeveloped countries.  Emily later gifted her design plans to townships across Africa, enabling Africans to build their own fridges and keep food fresh.

Invention #2 
Emily’s second invention also involved helping those in Africa. Millions of women walk miles a day to collect water, carrying over 40 pounds of water in a can on top of their heads. Not only is this extremely time consuming and tiring, but it is also extremely inconvenient as only one can be held at a time. To address this issue Emily designed a carrier that holds up to five water cans. It is made of tree branches and tire inner tubes. The carrier can also be altered to carry firewood and other heavy loads as well as be recycled at the end of its lifespan.

Invention #3 
Finally, after noticing that her Grandad who had arthritis could not squeeze his tube of toothpaste properly, Emily began to develop a dispenser that would combine the actions of squeezing and pushing out into one. The design includes an angled back plate and a lever that can be pushed by any part of the body. As this lever is lowered, it squeezes the tube down, minimizing waste and allowing for a smooth application. Beyond people with arthritis, Emily’s toothpaste dispenser is a solution for anyone who may have a disability, limited mobility, or prosthetic limbs. Her solution can also be used with a variety of products that come in a tube.

Awards 

 Top 10 Outstanding Young People in the World 2010 
 Barclays Women of the Year Award 2009 
 Cosmopolitan Magazine - Ultimate Save-the-Planet Pioneer 2008

References

External links 
 

1987 births
21st-century British inventors
Living people
Women inventors